Guelfenbein is a surname. Notable people with the surname include:

Carla Guelfenbein (born 1959), Chilean writer
Eduardo Guelfenbein (born 1953), Chilean painter